Gok was a state in South Sudan that existed between 2 October 2015 and 22 February 2020. It was located in the Bahr el Ghazal region, and was formerly part of the Lakes State. Gok State bordered Tonj to the west and Western Lakes to the east. The state had a population of 117,755 in 2008 and an estimated population of 174,460 in 2014.

History
Before the creation of Gok State, the state was formerly part of Lakes State. On 2 October 2015, President Salva Kiir issued a decree establishing 28 states in place of the 10 constitutionally established states. The decree established the new states largely along ethnic lines. A number of opposition parties and civil society groups challenged the constitutionality of the decree. Kiir later resolved to take it to parliament for approval as a constitutional amendment. In November the South Sudanese parliament empowered President Kiir to create new states.

Madang Majok was appointed Governor on 24 December.

Geography
Gok State is located in the Bahr el Ghazal region, and is one of the smallest states. Gok State borders Tonj State to the west and Western Lakes State to the east.

Administrative divisions
Gok State is currently consisted of nine counties. These counties are Cueibet (county seat: Cueibet), Abiriu (county seat: Abiriu), Duony (county seat: Duony), Waat (county seat: Pagor), Anyar Nguan (county seat: Tiaptiap), and Malou-Pech (county seat: Malou), Citcok (County Seat Citcok), Ngap (county Seat Ngap. Gok originally consisted only of a single county (Cueibet County). But as of 12 January plan 2019, Four more new counties were established, to bring a total number of fourteen .

Towns and cities
The capital of the state is the town of Cueibet. The town is located in Cueibet County, and is also the capital of the state.

References

Bahr el Ghazal
States of South Sudan